This page lists board and card games, wargames, miniatures games, and tabletop role-playing games published in 1992.  For video games, see 1992 in video gaming.

Games released or invented in 1992

Game awards given in 1992
 Spiel des Jahres: Um Reifenbreite
 Deutscher Spiele Preis: Flying Dutchman (German: der Fliegende Holländer)
 Best Children's Game: Schweinsgalopp
 Games: Pipeline

Significant games-related events in 1992
Queen Games founded by Rajive Gupta.

Deaths

See also
 1992 in video gaming

Games
Games by year